The Progress of a Crime is a 1960 mystery crime novel by the British writer Julian Symons. It was awarded the 1961 Edgar Award.

Synopsis
Hugh Bennett, a local reporter, sees what looks like a horrible crime taking place on a village green on Guy Fawkes Night. Right in front of the bonfire, a publican is stabbed to death by a gang of young males. However, once the case comes to court, Bennett begins to have doubts about exactly what he did witness.

References

Bibliography
 Bargainnier, Earl F. Twelve Englishmen of Mystery. Popular Press, 1984.
 Walsdorf, John J. & Allen, Bonnie J. Julian Symons: A Bibliography. Oak Knoll Press, 1996.
 White, Terry. Justice Denoted: The Legal Thriller in American, British, and Continental Courtroom Literature. Praeger, 2003.

1960 British novels
Novels by Julian Symons
British crime novels
British mystery novels
British thriller novels
Collins Crime Club books
Novels set in England